Horace Hallock "Hal" Brown (March 30, 1898 – December 25, 1983) was an American long-distance runner. He competed for the United States in the 1920 Summer Olympics held in Antwerp, Belgium in the 3000 meter team race where he won the gold medal together with his teammates Arlie Schardt and Ivan Dresser.

Brown won the 1916 New England Intercollegiate Cross Country meet leading Williams College to the team title.  After serving in World War I, he won the two miles at the 1920 IC4A championships in 9:27.6, establishing a Williams College record that stood until 1973. He won the 5000 meters at the 1920 US Olympic trials, qualifying for the Olympics in Antwerp.

He was born in Madison, New Jersey and died in Houston, Texas.

References

External links
 profile

American male long-distance runners
Olympic gold medalists for the United States in track and field
Athletes (track and field) at the 1920 Summer Olympics
People from Madison, New Jersey
Sportspeople from Morris County, New Jersey
Track and field athletes from New Jersey
American military personnel of World War I
1898 births
1983 deaths
Williams College alumni
Medalists at the 1920 Summer Olympics